The 2017 Hong Kong Cricket Sixes was the nineteenth edition of the Hong Kong Cricket Sixes, took place at Kowloon Cricket Club, Hong Kong. Eight teams competing in the tournament which lasted over two days from 28 to 29 October 2017. The previous tournament was won by South Africa who defeated Pakistan in the final.

Squads

Rules and regulations 
All standard laws of the game as laid down by the M. C. C. applied with the following significant differences:

General 
Games are played between two teams of six players, and consist of five overs of six balls, with the exception of the final which consists of five overs of eight balls.  Each member of the fielding side, with the exception of the wicket-keeper shall bowl one over.  Wides and no-balls count as two runs to the batting side, plus an extra ball.

Last man stands 
If five wickets fall (not including batsmen retiring not out) before the allocated overs have been completed, the remaining batsman continues, with the last batsman out remaining as a runner.  The not out batsman shall always face strike, and shall be declared out if his partner is declared out.

Batsman retire 
A batsman must retire not out on reaching 31 runs, but not before.  He may complete all runs scored on the ball on which he reaches his 31, and retire immediately after.  If one of the last pair of batsmen is out, any remaining not out batsman may resume his innings.  In the case where there is more than one, they must return in the order they retired.

Group Stage results

Pool A

Pool B

Qualifying Finals 
The quarter finals were decided based on overall standings. 1st v 8th, 2nd v 7th, 3rd v 6th and 4th v 5th.

Plate Finals 
The Plate Finals were played between the teams that finish 5th, 6th, 7th and 8th overall.

Semi-finals

Plate final

Cup Finals 
The Cup Finals decided the winners of the tournament, and were played between the teams that finish 1st, 2nd, 3rd and 4th overall. The cup final was played with 8 ball overs.

Semi-finals

3rd Place Playoff

Cup final

References

External links
 Results - Hong Kong Sixes 2017

Hong Kong Cricket Sixes
2017 in Hong Kong cricket